Tachypeles moretianus is a species of ground beetle in the genus Tachypeles of subfamily Paussinae. It was described by Deuve in 2004.

References

Paussinae
Beetles described in 2004